Mauro Máximo de Jesús (born 13 February 1957 in Aculco) is a Paralympian athlete from Mexico competing mainly in category F53 throwing events.

Biography
He competed in all three F52 throws at the 1996 Summer Paralympics in Atlanta, United States winning a bronze medal in the shot put.  In Sydney, Australia in 2004 Summer Paralympics he won two silvers in the F53 shot put and javelin.  In 2004 he improved his shot put to win the gold medal in the F53 class but this time failed to medal in either the F52-53 javelin or F53 discus.  In 2008 Summer Paralympics he defended his shot put gold medal in the F53/54 class but again failed to medal in the F53/54 javelin. In the 2012 Summer Paralympics in London, United Kingdom, he won the silver medal in the shot put in the F52/53 category.

References

External links
 

1957 births
Living people
Paralympic athletes of Mexico
Athletes (track and field) at the 1996 Summer Paralympics
Athletes (track and field) at the 2000 Summer Paralympics
Athletes (track and field) at the 2004 Summer Paralympics
Athletes (track and field) at the 2008 Summer Paralympics
Paralympic gold medalists for Mexico
Paralympic silver medalists for Mexico
Paralympic bronze medalists for Mexico
World record holders in Paralympic athletics
Medalists at the 1996 Summer Paralympics
Medalists at the 2000 Summer Paralympics
Medalists at the 2004 Summer Paralympics
Medalists at the 2008 Summer Paralympics
Medalists at the 2012 Summer Paralympics
People from Aculco
Sportspeople from the State of Mexico
Medalists at the 2007 Parapan American Games
Medalists at the 2011 Parapan American Games
Mexican male shot putters
Mexican male javelin throwers
Paralympic medalists in athletics (track and field)
Wheelchair shot putters
Wheelchair javelin throwers
Paralympic shot putters
Paralympic javelin throwers